Hans Geiger (24 December 1905 – 17 December 1974) was a German international footballer.

References

1905 births
1974 deaths
Association football midfielders
German footballers
Germany international footballers
1. FC Nürnberg players
Tennis Borussia Berlin players
German football managers
1. FSV Mainz 05 managers
20th-century German people